Antonio Rivas Padilla is a Colombian accordion player. He has got to know many of the great masters of the Vallenato's folklore such as Alejendro Duran; Abel Antonio Villa; Mariano Perez; Pablo Garcia; Emilianito Zuleta; Alfredo Gutierrez; Ismael Rudas; Pablo Lopez and many others.

Biography 

He was born in Istimina, Colombia, to Adriano Rivas and Sabina Padilla. Completely self-taught, he took up the diatonic accordion at the age of fifteen.

He earned a master's degree in mathematics in Colombia, then moved to France, where he completed a PhD in high-energy physics and a master's degree in computer science. In 1984, he created the group Antonio y sus Vallenatos in Montpellier. In 1987, with Nemesio Jimenes ('EI Condor'), he founded the group Novedad Vallenata in Paris.

In Europe, Antonio Rivas takes part in most of the international events involving the diatonic accordion. In 1995 he appeared at WOMEX, the World Music Expo in Brussels, and at the town hall of Paris for the 50th anniversary of UNESCO.

Discography 

 1991 : La Perla de Arseguel / Music and Words / MWCD 3002 – CD-LP-MC
 1995 : El Jardinero Colombiano / Silex – Audivis / B 6803 – CD
 1997 : Despierta Corazon / Lilopé / Milan – CD
 2011 : Vaya Con Dios / Arivas Productions / ARP CD 001

Collaborations 

 2003 : Chants de Noël Latinoamèricans (With the band Noel Latino)
 2005 : Clapotis (With the band Au Fil De L'aire)
 2008 : Pasajero (With the band Gipsy Kings)

Films and documentaries 

1995: Mother-of-pearl confidences
Documentary broadcast in France by FR 3 (26 minutes)

1997: "Passat" 
Emission Dutch International TV

1999: NET Television
Greek International TV

 1999 : Participation to the Music of the Film "Chili con carne", from Thomas Gilou with Antoine de Caunes, Valentina Vargas and Gilbert Melki

References

External links 
  Site officiel
 Profil Myspace

Living people
Colombian accordionists
Year of birth missing (living people)
21st-century accordionists